The Pan-African Mathematics Olympiads (P.A.M.O.) are the African version of the IMO, International Mathematical Olympiad.

Description
This event organized each year by the African Mathematics Union (AMU) is a competition among the best pupils in Mathematics of Secondary Education who are less than twenty (20) years old.

History
The first PAMO was organized in 1987.

Recent Editions
Event editions

Previous Editions

Format
The competition is made of two rounds. Each round is made of 3 problems for four hours and thirty minutes while each problem's total score is 7 points. There are up to six candidates per country.

Results published by each country

Archived Results

References

External links 
Official website

https://www.moroccoworldnews.com/2022/07/350096/morocco-tunisia-win-pan-african-mathematics-olympiad-2022

Mathematics competitions
Recurring events established in 1987